The Land Rover Range Rover Sport, generally known simply as the Range Rover Sport, is a mid-size luxury SUV produced under their Land Rover marque, from the British manufacturer Land Rover, and later Jaguar Land Rover. The first generation (codename: L320) started production in 2005, and was replaced by the second generation Sport (codename: L494) in 2013.

Range Stormer concept

The Range Rover Sport was prefigured by the Range Stormer concept car, introduced at the 2004 North American International Auto Show.
This was a low-slung, short wheelbase 3-door coupé that was unusually "sporty" in the context of Land Rover's history. Designed by Richard Woolley, the marque's first complete concept car sported split-folding gullwing doors, one-piece skeletal seats, a "clamshell" bonnet, 22 inch alloys, a  top speed, 4WD and a  weight. The Range Rover Sport was comparably of much more conservative design featuring five doors and a wheelbase hardly shorter than that of the Range Rover Vogue.
A replica of the Stormer was built by West Coast Customs of Corona, CA for Sheikh Hamdan bin Mohammed Al Maktoum, Crown Prince of Dubai, on the occasion of opening West Coast Customs Dubai; the car is currently registered under the Dubai Traffic And Road Authority.

The Range Stormer is now on display at the Heritage Motor Centre in Gaydon, Warwickshire, UK.

First generation (L320; 2005–2013)

Chassis 
The chassis has been adapted from the integrated bodyframe, semi-monocoque, independently suspended design which debuted on the Discovery 3 in 2004. This allegedly gives the Range Rover Sport the refinement and structural rigidity advantages of a monocoque chassis with the robustness of a separate chassis design for off-road applications. It also allows for less expensive manufacturing of the vehicles due to a large number of common components. Its smaller dimensions and its raked roofline make it impossible to accommodate third-row occupants like the Discovery 3, but as a sports tourer it was never intended to be a seven-seater. Brembo front brakes are standard on all models except the TDV6. 

N.B.

Service Bulletins for most 05-09 models have 2 types of brakes listed. Brembo and non-Brembo. Check your build data sheet or via VIN/CHASSIS number for all models, if needed.

Powertrain 

Both petrol engines have been designed with a sump and oil pick-up system to allow for operation at extreme angles. Due to lack of popularity, the naturally aspirated power plant was omitted from the UK market in 2007. It features a compacted graphite iron block and aluminium cylinder head with fast switching piezo crystal injectors. Debuting in both the Sport and the flagship Range Rover in 2007 was the 3.6-litre twin turbodiesel TDV8. This engine is a further adaptation of the TDV6 but features a 90 degree block (as opposed to a 60 degree layout), twin variable geometry turbochargers and inlet valve deactivation. All engine variants are mated to an adaptive six-speed ZF 6HP transmission (ZF6HP26) ZF automatic transmission, except the SDV6, which received the ZF 8HP transmission (ZF8HP70). These gearboxes has a unique mode: CommandShift which reacts and adapts to varying driving styles. CommandShift gives the driver the freedom to sequentially manipulate gear changes.

Suspension 
There is also an extra height available which is accessed by holding the respective button for when the off-road ride height is not enough. When the vehicle bellies out, its control system will sense weight being lessened on the air springs and the ride height is automatically raised to the suspensions greatest articulation. The cross-link aspect of the suspension system, which debuted on the L322 Range Rover in 2002, results in better off-road performance by electronically operating valves in pneumatic lines which link adjacent air springs. In the event of a wheel on one side being raised when travelling off-road, the pneumatic valves are opened and the adjacent wheel is forced down, simulating the action of a live axle setup.

Terrain Response 

Land Rover's patented Terrain Response system which debuted on the Discovery 3 is fitted as standard on all models. In the L320 Terrain Response allows the driver to select each of the 5 additional modes using a switch, pressing left or right to select the mode, in the L494 Terrain Response 2 allows the driver to adjust chassis and transmission settings (5 Five settings) to suit the terrain being traversed via a rotary knob on the centre console. These include general driving; grass, gravel, snow; mud and ruts; sand; and rock crawl. Suspension ride height, engine management, throttle mapping, transfer case ranges, transmission settings, electronic driving aids (such as electronic traction control (ETC), dynamic stability control (DSC) and hill descent control (HDC)) and electronic e-diffs are all manipulated through the Terrain Response system. All Range Rover Sports are equipped with a standard centre e-diff from Magna Steyr Powertrain which electronically locks and unlocks and apportions torque via means of a multi-plate clutch pack located in the transfer case which also offers 'shift-on-the-move' dual-range operation. A rear e-diff is optional on all Range Rover Sport models and is able to lock and unlock instantaneously. An in-dash display is available which, among other things, is linked to Terrain Response and displays important off-road information such as the status of the e-diffs, the angle of the steering and wheel articulation. It is also able to inform the driver of wheels which do not have contact with the ground.

Driving technologies 
Dynamic Response incorporates electrohydraulic active anti-roll bars which react to cornering forces and activate and deactivate accordingly resulting in sublime on-road handling. Dynamic Response also aids off-road performance by decoupling the anti-sway bars to allow maximum wheel articulation. The system in an evolution of the acclaimed ACE (Active Cornering Enhancement) system available on the Discovery Series II but is described as proactive rather than reactive. Positive Torque, a system standard on all TDV8 and Supercharged models, electronically blips the throttle, resulting in faster downshifts and the availability of vast reserves of torque. The speed sensitive steering system, adopted from Jaguar is standard on all models and there's the option of active bi-xenon headlamps which act with the angle of the steering to aid vision. Active Cruise Control (ACC) with Forward Alert system incorporates an integrated front bumper radar which detects vehicles travelling ahead and adapts the vehicle's speed to match. The system scans the road ten times a second, has a 16 degree field of view and Land Rover claims it is able to discriminate between a heavy vehicle and an adjacent lane motorcycle travelling at least  ahead. Four preset distances are selectable and will ensure the Sport maintains the desired distance from the vehicle it is following.

Safety 
The NCWR organisation (New Car Whiplash Ratings) tested the Range Rover Sport in 2010 and awarded it the following scores:

G = Good, A = Acceptable, M = Marginal, P = Poor

Security 
The Range Rover Sport was tested by Thatcham's New Vehicle Security Ratings (NVSR) organisation and achieved the following ratings:

Facelift (2009) 

A facelifted model was first shown at the New York Auto Show in April 2009. The 2010 Range Rover Sport featured a more aerodynamic front-end including new headlights, grille and bumper. Electric power folding mirrors were also added. Also new are revised rear lights and rear bumper. Interior revisions are more significant with a new fascia, steering wheel, door linings, seats, instruments and switchgear. The new model has more leather apparent and nearly 50 percent fewer dash board buttons than the previous model. Three new engines made their debut in the 2010 Sport. These include an all-new direct injected, all-aluminium 5.0-litre petrol V8 engine in naturally aspirated and supercharged guises as seen in Jaguar's latest range of high-performance vehicles. The naturally aspirated model produces  and  torque while the supercharged produces  and  torque. This engine features parallel sequential turbochargers – a single variable geometry turbocharger and a single fixed geometry turbocharger which is only active when required as seen on the Jaguar XF Diesel S.  All of the new engines produce increased power and torque over their predecessors while delivering better fuel economy and reduced  emissions. Fitted with a sixth generation twin-vortex supercharger with an improved thermodynamic efficiency of 16 percent, the new 5.0-litre supercharged engine produces 29 percent more power and 12 percent more torque than the current 4.2-litre engine, yet  emissions and fuel consumption are improved by 5.6 percent and 6.2 percent respectively. The new 3.0-litre TDV6 engine produces 29 percent more power and 36 percent more torque than the 2.7-litre engine, yet  emissions and fuel consumption are both improved by 9 percent. The 2010 model year Sport is also fitted with the new ZF HP28 six-speed automatic transmission. Designed to improve performance and efficiency, the new transmission engages the lock-up clutches of each gear earlier after selection. Suspension refinements also occurred with the introduction of the world's first production damping system using model-based predictive technology that continually optimise the settings of the new DampTronic Valve Technology damper units to optimise vehicle ride and control. Further improvements to the award-winning Terrain Response system have taken place for 2010. Revisions to the rock crawl program reduce roll when traversing boulders delivering a more composed ride over rocky terrain. The addition of a new 'sand launch control' prevents wheels digging in when driving away in soft sand thanks to revisions to the traction control system. The Hill Descent Control system has also been enhanced with the addition of Gradient Release Control, which inhibits the initial rate of acceleration when descending steep inclines.

Facelift (2012) 
A final facelift to the L320 platform came in MY12 introducing minor changes. The interior remained largely the same however features such as an electric power tailgate and revised media interface featuring bluetooth audio streaming were added. There was also the addition of the ZF 8 speed automatic transmission and accompanying rotary wheel gear selector.

Trim 
Throughout its production run, the first generation Range Rover Sport was available in a variety of trims.

 S (2006-2009): Sold only in Europe, the S was the cheapest Range Rover Sport available, this version came with cloth seating, a CD player, cruise control, sat nav, and the 2.7TD V6 diesel.
 SE (2006-2013): Sold only in Europe, the SE was a step up from the S, adding features such as heated seats, parking sensors and fog lights, it became the base trim after the S model was dropped.
 HSE (2006-2013): Serving as the base model for the North American market throughout its life, the HSE came standard with leather seating, dual zone automatic climate control, 19 inch wheels, 14 speaker 600 watt sound system, and the 4.4L naturally aspirated V8 (later replaced by the 5.0L V8 for the facelift models). In the UK, this version was also offered with the diesel V6 or V8. It was later offered with a Luxury package, which included much of the optional equipment as standard
 Supercharged (2006-2013): The performance model, the Supercharged added the supercharged V8 engine for improved performance, as well as other luxury features.
 HST (2006-2009): Exclusive to Europe, the HST added a sportier body kit with new bumpers and grille designs, and came with much of the optional equipment fitted as standard. It was only available with either the supercharged petrol V8 or diesel V8.
 Autobiography (2011-2013): Serving as the top trim, the Autobiography included adaptive automatic headlights, new wheels, a 360-degree camera system and more luxurious upholstery for the ultimate Range Rover Sport.
 HST Limited Edition (2009): Exclusive to North America, the HST Limited Edition was a limited production version of the European HST. Sold only with the supercharged V8 engine, it included the same body kit as the regular HST, plus unique wheels and upholstery.
 GT Limited Edition (2011-2013): Sold only in North America, the GT Limited Edition was a limited production version of the HSE which incorporated luxury features from the Autobiography as standard equipment.

Controversy 

The Range Rover Sport made Ford's Premier Automotive Group the target of a protest by Greenpeace in 2005. The protesters infiltrated an assembly facility and temporarily delayed production of the vehicle. Greenpeace cited issues with greenhouse gas emissions, and by extension, global warming. Although for this test the EPA used their newly calibrated system for 2008 and on. Greenpeace stated they did not take issue with the production of vehicles such as the Land Rover Defender as they are typically used for off-road applications on a much more frequent basis than vehicles such as the Range Rover Sport which they claim "has been tuned primarily for on road performance".

Second generation (L494; 2013–2022)

The second-generation Range Rover Sport was announced on 27 March 2013 at the New York Auto Show. Several streets were shut down in Manhattan for a launch party at the Auto Show starring James Bond actor Daniel Craig.

Design

The new Range Rover Sport continues in the design direction that produced the Evoque styling, and the full-size 2013 Range Rover. Unlike the previous generation that uses an integrated bodyframe chassis, the L494 Range Rover Sport utilises an all-aluminium monocoque body, just like the L405 Range Rover.

It introduced Dynamic Response suspension with active anti-roll bars.

Facelift (2018-2022)
In 2017, at the Los Angeles Car Show, the Jaguar Land Rover Group announced the facelifted Range Rover Sport would begin production in 2018. The new Sport features new headlights, a new interior with the touch duo system and a MHEV 355 and 395 HP as well as a V8 with 518 HP and the SVR version with 575 HP. The main changes in the facelift are redesigned front and rear bumpers, new exhausts (two black pipes on S & SE variants, twin silver pipes on HSE, HSE Dynamic and Autobiography with Dynamic Pack and Quad exhausts on the SVR Variant) and upgraded touch duo infotainment from the 2018 Range Rover Velar.

Special Models

SVR (2015-2018) (Pre-Facelift)

On 11 August 2014, the Range Rover SVR (Special Vehicle Racing) was announced by Land Rover at Pebble Beach. The model sports a number of aesthetic alterations and performance improvements.

The design of the model features a fully revised front bumper, with larger ducts and the main grille finished in black. The front quarter ducts are also revised and completed in a black finish. The rear bumper is also completely revised with a new, more pronounced diffuser and twin-circle exhaust tips. The SVR comes with 21 inch alloy wheels, wrapped in 275/45 R21 all-season tyres as standard.

The chassis had also been revised for the model. Debut of Adaptive Dynamics with Magnetorheological dampers. New for the SVR is the addition of an Active exhaust system with electronically controlled valves.

HST Limited Edition (2016)

Officially unveiled at the 2015 New York International Auto Show, the HST Limited Edition returned to the North American Range Rover Sport lineup after a 7-year hiatus and, similar to the previous iterations, put emphasis on driving dynamics and sportiness. Designed to bridge the gap between the V6 powered HSE and the Supercharged models, the HST Limited Edition featured a tuned version of the HSE's 3.0 L Jaguar AJ supercharged V6 with 380 bhp, 40 more than standard. It also included many other features to allow for a more road focused and dynamic Range Rover Sport, including unique 21-inch wheels, upgraded brakes and suspension, chassis enhancements, and a reprogrammed AWD system. To cosmetically distinguish it from other models, the HST Limited Edition featured darkened headlight and taillight bezels, a black painted roof and hood vents, red "Sport" badges, red brake calipers, Oxford leather interior, and a unique front and rear fascia. It was offered in four metallic colors, Indus Silver, Santorini Black, Corris Grey and Firenze Red, as well as the non metallic Fuji White.

Only offered in limited production for the 2016 model year, the HST Limited Edition would be discontinued for 2017 and effectively replaced by the HSE Dynamic, which featured many of the same mechanical changes as the HST. The HSE Dynamic was sold until partway through 2019, when Land Rover replaced it with a new non-limited HST, this time powered by the new Ingenium AJ300 inline-6 hybrid engine.

SVR (2018-2022) (Facelift)

In 2017 at the LA Auto Show, the facelifted Range Rover Sport SVR was announced by the Jaguar Land Rover Group. This facelifted model includes all of the same features that the 2018 Range Rover Sport has, but the SVR has upgraded body styling which includes the new Silver Quad Exhausts and the new option of a Carbon Fibre bonnet. The 2018 SVR still includes the same 5.0L Supercharged V8 from the Jaguar F-Type, but the engine now produces  instead of the pre-facelift's , allowing the SVR to accelerate from 0-60 mph (97 km/h) in 4 seconds.

Due to its large size and poor environmental record, Environmental Action Germany nominated the Range Rover Sport SVR for their Goldener Geier (Golden Vulture) 2020 award.

Third generation (L461; 2022-)

The 2023 Range Rover Sport was revealed in May 2022. The chopped-roof sibling of the regular Range Rover gains minimalist styling inside and out with powertrain options ranging from MHEV, PHEV and eventually a twin-turbo V8. An all-electric version is expected to launch in 2024.

Sales

References

External links 

 
 New Range Rover Sport microsite
 

Land Rover vehicles
Cars introduced in 2005
2010s cars
2020s cars
Mid-size sport utility vehicles
Luxury sport utility vehicles
Euro NCAP large off-road
All-wheel-drive vehicles